Baap Re Baap (English: Father O Father!) is a 2019 Gujarati comedy thriller film directed by Sagar Kalaria, produced by Parth Banugaria and Sachin Rathod under the banner of Patang films in association with Fikar Not Films. The film starring Rajeev Mehta in the title role along with Tej Joshi, highlights a father and son relationship. The film was released in India on 18 January 2019.

Plot 
The relation between Ajay (Tej Joshi) and his father (Rajeev Mehta) has turned sour after the untimely death of the former's mother. As Ajay becomes more and more egotistic, self-centered and rebellious, he even loses his best friends in the process. At such an unexpected crossroads of his life, fate serves him a lesson he must learn and put at stake everything that he has taken for granted. What ensues is a hyper-coaster ride of thrill, humor and emotions altogether. The film traces his journey of grappling with these challenges and coming to terms with everything he has ruined.

Cast 

 Rajeev Mehta as Purushottam (The Baap)
 Tej Joshi as Ajay
 Tillana Desai as Sapna
 Bhargav Thaker as Vinit
 Pratik Rathod as Divyesh
 Farooq Khan as Sukhiram
 Dilip Dave as Shantilal
 Kiran Mehta as Hoshiyarchand
 Paresh Shukla as Mansukh
 Manohar Kapadia as Bahadur
 Tejas Parmar as Aamli
 Nihar Nanavati as Pipli
 Hemang Dave as Champak Sheth
 Dilip Soni as Harbu
 Prapti Ajwalia as Nidhi
 Alka Mehta as Hansaben
 Maurali Patel as Sarlaben
 Deepika Ajwalia as Mallikaben
 Milan Trivedi as Kidnapper

Production

Development 
The idea for the film was conceived in April, 2015 when the producers hired Sagar Kalaria as the director for their maiden project. Patang Films struck up an association with Fikar Not Films, two-time Gold Film of the Year winners at India Film Project. This liaison led to the other key members joining the team. Scripting began in the month of May and was concluded in the month of October. Tej Joshi was cast as the lead and Rajeev Mehta was signed for the titular role of the father.

Filming 
Principal photography commenced in November, 2015. The film was shot at various locations of Rajkot and Ahmedabad.

Post-production 
The film suffered numerous unforeseen challenges in the post-production phase which lasted for almost three years.

Soundtrack 
The music was released by Krup Music.

Release 
The trailer of the film was unveiled on 20 December 2018 and the film was released on 18 January 2019.

References

External links 

 
 Baap Re Baap Album on Gaana
 Baap Re Baap Album on JioSaavn



2019 films
Indian comedy thriller films
2010s Gujarati-language films